Mohammad Ridwan Hafiedz or Ridho (born September 3, 1973, Ambon, Indonesia) is an Indonesian guitarist, backing vocalist and songwriter. He is best known as Slank's rhythm guitarist and back vocalist along with another lead guitarist, Abdee Negara. With Slank, Ridho has created nine studio albums and three live albums, also one compilation album which was released in May 2006.

Early life
Ridho was born and raised in a Muslim family from Ambon, Indonesia. His musical background is considered active back when he was in middle school as he started to play guitar since year 7.

Career

Pre-Slank career
As mentioned above, Ridho started to play guitar when he was in year 7, with Jimi Hendrix and The Beatles as his idols. His experience in the music industry began when he formed a band called LFM in 1991, just six years before he joined Slank. After he finished his formal education, he went to Hollywood, United States, to study music at Musicians Institute to gain his musical tertiary education.

Slank
In 1996, three from five of the members of Slank left the band. The problem arose from the drug addictions of Bimbim (drummer) and Kaka (lead vocalist). However, Slank chose to rise and recruited new members to revitalize Slank, that was when three new members were introduced; Abdee, Ivan, and of course, Ridho. Currently Ridho spends his time conducting guitar clinics, teaching students, and running his guitar company.

Music

Style
Ridho's musical style has given a big contribution to Slank's style, rock and blues. Since his idols are Jimi Hendrix and The Beatles, no wonder that he has such of blues influences.

Equipment
 Marlique Ridho Hafiedz Model
 Valhala Amp
Ridho has his own guitar model, the Marlique Ridho, which is made and designed in Indonesia.

Discography
 Tujuh (1997) 
 Mata Hati Reformasi (1998) 
 Konser Piss 30 Kota (1998) 
 999 + 09 Biru (1999) 
 999 + 09 Abu Abu (1999) 
 De Bestnya Slank (2000)
 Ngangkang (2000) 
 Virus (2001) 
 Virus Roadshow (2002) 
 Satu Satu (2003) 
 Bajakan (2003) 
 P.L.U.R (2004) 
 Slankissme (2005) 
 Since 1983 - Malaysia Edition (2006)

Personal life
He was married Ony Serojawati at August 25, 2001. His children are Marco Maliq Hafiedz, Omar Hakeem Hafiedz, and Stella Aisha Hafiedz.

See also
 Slank

Footnotes

External links
Official Slank website
Official Marlique Guitars website

1973 births
Indonesian guitarists
Living people
People from Ambon, Maluku
21st-century guitarists